The Ipeľ (Slovak) or Ipoly (Hungarian) (German: Eipel, archaic Slovak: Jupoľ, Latin: Bolia) is a  long river in Slovakia and Hungary, a tributary of the Danube River. Its source is in central Slovakia in the Slovak Ore Mountains. It flows south to the Hungarian border, and then southwest, west, and again south along the border until it flows into the Danube near Szob. 

The Ipeľ flows through or creates the border of the Banská Bystrica and Nitra regions in Slovakia, and Nógrád and Pest counties in Hungary.

Towns and villages
The following towns and villages are situated on the river, in downstream order:
 Poltár (SK)
 Kalinovo (SK)
 Boľkovce (SK)
 Ipolytarnóc (HU)
 Litke (HU)
 Nógrádszakál (HU)
 Szécsény (HU)
 Balassagyarmat (HU)
 Ipolyvece (HU)
 Ipeľské Predmostie (SK) 
 Šahy (SK)
 Vámosmikola (HU)
 Pastovce (SK)
 Ipolytölgyes (HU)
 Salka (SK)
 Letkés (HU)
 Ipolydamásd (HU)
 Szob (HU)

See also
Ipoly (Ipeľ) Bridges

Notes and references

Rivers of Slovakia
Rivers of Hungary
Tributaries of the Danube
International rivers of Europe
Hungary–Slovakia border